Brisbane College of Theology, located in Auchenflower, Brisbane, Queensland, Australia, was an ecumenical theological education consortium (1983–2009), comprising St Francis' Theological College (Anglican), St Paul's Theological College (Roman Catholic), (formerly under the operations of the Pius XII Seminary), and Trinity Theological College (Uniting). The B.C.T was inaugurated on March 28, 1983.

It was based at Raymont Lodge in Auchenflower but effectively operated from this location and also concurrently at Saint Francis Theological College in Milton and Pius XII/ Saint Paul's Theological College at Banyo. The college offered both under-graduate and post-graduate qualifications.  It ceased operations as an umbrella organisation for the three colleges in 2009, in part due to the administrative overheads involved in running a small tertiary institution in the Australian higher education system.

St Francis' Theological College now runs its programs as part of Charles Sturt University, Trinity initially through Australian Catholic University and now the Australian College of Theology and St Paul's through the Australian Catholic University.

See also

Australian College of Theology
Sydney College of Divinity

References

Education in Brisbane
Seminaries and theological colleges in Australia
Auchenflower, Queensland
1983 establishments in Australia
2009 disestablishments in Australia